Covedale is a former village in Hamilton County, Ohio, United States. The main area of the village was annexed by the city of Cincinnati and is now a neighborhood of about 15,000 people in the western part of the city. When it was annexed, the village disincorporated and its remaining area reverted to Green Township, with a small fragment going to Delhi Township.

Covedale is located about six miles west of downtown Cincinnati. It is primarily a residential neighborhood of tree lined streets with brick and Tudor-style homes. Commercial areas are mainly centered about Glenway Avenue.

The U.S. Census provides population and demographic data for the area that remains in the townships, Covedale (CDP).

See also
 Covedale (CDP), Ohio

Former municipalities in Ohio
Geography of Hamilton County, Ohio
Neighborhoods in Cincinnati